Berezdiv is a village in Shepetivka Raion (district) of Khmelnytskyi Oblast (province) in western Ukraine. It hosts the administration of Berezdiv rural hromada, one of the hromadas of Ukraine. Population of Berezdiv is about  1,250 inhabitants. In Berezdiv is located school, Eastern Orthodox Church, Shepetivka Museum branch and three cemeteries: Eastern Orthodox, Catholic and Jewish.

Geography

It is located by the rivers Korchik, Siechanka. 32 km North-East from Slavuta. 18 km South from Korets.

Berezdiv, at 50°28′N, 28°06′E, is situated at altitude of 210m.

History

Until the second Partition of the Polish–Lithuanian Commonwealth Berezdiv belonged to the Crown of Polish Kingdom. Berezdiv goods belonged to Ostrozky, Chodkiewicz, Lubomirski and Jablonowski duke families. In 1775 Berezdiv was founded by Braclav voivode Jan Jablonowski, wooden Blessed Virgin Mary Church. In 1992 it was dismantled because of the state of emergency.

In 1831 Berezdiv had been confiscated by Russian Government.

At the end of the 19th century it was small town with a population of 590 people (306 of which were Jews).

In 1954 Berezdiv had lost town privileges, and became a village.

Until 18 July 2020, Berezdiv belonged to Slavuta Raion. The raion was abolished in July 2020 as part of the administrative reform of Ukraine, which reduced the number of raions of Khmelnytskyi Oblast to three. The area of Slavuta Raion was merged into Khmelnytskyi Raion.

References

Bibliography
Geographic Dictionary of the Polish Kingdom and other Slavic Countries, 1881

External links
 Journey to Berezdiv
 Official site of English Circle in Berezdiv School
 Link to film presenting place after former Blessed Virgin Mary Church

Volhynian Governorate
Villages in Sheptivka Raion